Arnim is a German surname, often preceded by the nobiliary particle "von", meaning "of". Notable people with the surname include:

 Adolf von Arnim-Boitzenburg (1832-1887), German landowner and politician
 Adolf Heinrich von Arnim-Boitzenburg (1803–1868), German statesman
 Arnulf von Arnim (born 1947), German classical pianist and teacher
 Bernd von Arnim (died 1917), German naval officer
 Bernd von Arnim (politician) (1850-1939), Prussian politician, agriculture minister
 Bettina von Arnim (1785–1859), German writer and novelist
 Daniela von Arnim (born 1964) German bridge champion
 Elizabeth von Arnim (1866–1941), British novelist
 Ferdinand von Arnim (1814–1866), German architect and watercolour-painter
 Gisela von Arnim (1827–1889), German writer
 Gustav von Arnim (1829–1909), German general of the Infantry
 Hans von Arnim (1859-1931), German philologist
 Hans von Arnim (general) (1846–1922), German general
 Hans Georg von Arnim-Boitzenburg (1583–1641), German field marshal, diplomat, and politician
 Hans-Jürgen von Arnim (1889–1962), German World War II general
 Heinrich Alexander von Arnim (1798-1861), Prussian statesman.
 Heinrich Friedrich von Arnim-Heinrichsdorff-Werbelow (1791–1859), Prussian statesman
 Harry von Arnim (1824–1881), German diplomat
 Iris von Arnim (born 1945), German fashion designer
 Karl Gustav Theodor von Arnim (1796-1877), Prussian general
 Ludwig Achim von Arnim (1781–1831), German poet and novelist

See also
 Friedrich Bertram Sixt von Armin (1851–1936), German World War I general
 Hans-Heinrich Sixt von Armin (1890–1952), German World War II general
 Arnim family, German noble family
 

German-language surnames